Libya is a North African country along the Mediterranean Sea. It is bordered by Egypt to the east, Sudan to the southeast, Chad and Niger to the south, and Algeria and Tunisia to the west. The Libyan culture is a blend of many influences, due to its exposure to many historical eras. Its culture involves roots in Berber, African, Turkish and Arab cultures. Libya was also an Italian colony for about three decades, which had a great impact on the culture. Libya has managed to keep its traditional folk culture alive to today.

The majority of Libyans are Arab, and 96.6% are Muslim Sunnis. Languages spoken in Libya mostly Arabic. Italian and English are spoken in a minor level and in tourist areas.

90% of the country is desert and this is why only 10% of Libya’s population live outside the coastline region.

Flag 

In February 2011, when the Libyan revolution took place, the national Transition Council reintroduced the old flag used by the kingdom prior to Gaddafi’s military coup in 1969. The flag consists of three colors: red, black and green, which represent the three major regions of the country, red for Fezzan, Black for Cyrenaica and green for Tripolitania; the crescent and star represent the main religion of Libya, Islam.

Literature

Libyan literature has its roots in antiquity, but contemporary writing from Libya draws on a variety of influences.

Libyan poet Khaled Mattawa remarks:
"Against claims that Libya has a limited body of literature, classicists may be quick to note that ancient Greek lyric poet Callimachus and the exquisite prose stylist Sinesius were Libyan. But students of Libyan history and literature will note that a vast time gap between those ancient luminaries and the writers of today. [...] Libya has historically made a limited contribution to Arabian literature".

The Arab Renaissance (Al-Nahda) of the late 19th and early 20th centuries did not reach Libya as early as other Arab lands, and Libyans contributed little to its initial development. However, Libya at this time developed its own literary tradition, centred on oral poetry, much of which expressed the suffering brought about by the Italian colonial period.

Libyan literature began to bloom in the late 1960s, with the writings of Sadeq al-Neihum, Khalifa al-Fakhri, Khamel al-Maghur (prose), Muhammad al-Shaltami, and Ali al-Regeie (poetry). Many Libyan writers of the 1960s adhered to nationalist, socialist, and generally progressive views.

In 1969, a military coup brought Muammar al-Gaddafi to power. In the mid-1970s, the new government set up a single publishing house, and authors were required to write in support of the authorities. Those who refused were imprisoned, emigrated, or ceased writing. Censorship laws were loosened, but not abolished in the early 1990s, resulting in a literary renewal. Some measure of dissent began to be expressed in Libyan literature, but books remained censored and self-censored to a significant extent.

With the overthrow of Gaddafi's government in the Libyan Civil War, literary censorship was abolished, and Article 14 of the interim constitution guarantees "liberty of the press, publication and mass media". Contemporary Libyan literature is influenced by "local lore, North African and Eastern Mediterranean Arabian literatures, and world literature at large" (K. Mattawa). Émigré writers have also contributed significantly to Libyan literature, and include Ibrahim Al-Kouni, Ahmad Al-Faqih, and Sadeq al-Neihum.

Cuisine

Libyan dishes borrow from the Arabic, Mediterranean and Italian cultures that met in the area. Olives, palm oil, dates, unleavened bread, and stuffed sweet peppers appear frequently in meals. Libyans do not consume any type of pork and all meats must be halal (killed humanely and prayed over according to Muslim customs). Attention to detail in Libyan cooking is very important; in fact, many spices are used in all the dishes and they need to be put in by the right amounts to enrich the taste. The Libyan diet is rich with seafood and includes a diversity of vegetables and cereals. Olive oil is the main ingredient of nearly every meal.

Meals are of great symbolic importance in the Libyan culture and the biggest meal of the day is lunch. Shops and businesses close for a couple of hours in the afternoon to allow families to gather together and eat. There are four main ingredients of traditional Libyan food: olives, palm dates, grains, and milk. Meals usually end with fruit or melon (Libya is known to have excellent fruit crops). People also drink green tea after meals to help aid digestion. Libyans love tea and coffee, and families usually gather together for their afternoon tea/coffee and catch up on the daily gossip. Libyan tea is known to have thick consistency. The Libyan tea is very strong and thick, kind of like syrup. To follow tradition, the tea is usually first poured into a mug and then into another then back to the original mug, back and forth for a few minutes then poured from a high distance to the glass to form ‘reghwa’ or foam.

Libyan soup is a very famous dish throughout Libya and is often presented as a starter. It is considered to be an important dish in Ramadan, where people usually break their fast with soup (after having a glass of milk and a couple of dates). It is a thick highly spiced soup, known simply as Shba Arabiya, or "Arabian soup". It contains many of the ingredients from many other Libyan dishes, including onions, tomatoes, meat (chicken or lamb), chili peppers, cayenne pepper, saffron, chickpeas, mint, cilantro, and parsley.

Bazeen or Bazin is also a very recognizable Libyan food. It is made of a mixture of barley flour, with a little plain flour. The flour is boiled in salted water to make a hard dough, then is kneaded into a semi-spherical ball and placed in the middle of a large bowl (women sit on the floor and hold the pan between their legs while using a wooden ladle to mix and kneed the dough to its solid and thick consistency), around which the sauce is poured. The sauce around the dough is made by frying chopped onions with lamb meat, adding turmeric, salt, cayenne pepper, black pepper, fenugreek, sweet paprika, and tomato paste. Potatoes can also be added. Finally, eggs are boiled and arranged around the dome. The dish is then served with a well-known Libyan salad/complement of pickled carrots, cucumber and chili peppers, known as amasyar.

Another type of Bazin is called ‘Aish’ or ‘Aseeda’ which basically follows the same concept of the Bazzin except it is made with pure white flour, has a smoother and softer texture and is eaten sweet by adding honey, syrup or on some occasions powdered sugar. Aish is normally eaten as breakfast or on special occasions, like when a baby is born or ‘Maylood’, (Mohammed’s birth date).

One of the most popular meals in the Libyan cuisine, which is also a Libyan specialty, since it is not found anywhere else, is batata mubattana (filled potato). It consists of fried potato pieces filled with spiced minced meat and covered with egg and breadcrumbs.

Some other popular dishes in Libya include a diversity of pasta, which are one of Italy’s lasting influences and couscous, which is widely popular across the North African region.

All alcohol is banned in Libya, in accordance with Sharia, the religious laws of Islam. Bottled mineral water is widely consumed, as well as various soft drinks, such as the Coca-Cola.

Libyan traditional dress 
Nowadays, in modern Libya, people no longer wear the traditional dress very often, especially women, except the elderly Libyans, who still comply with traditions. The normal dress includes international modernized fashion that has spread out from the Western World. Women in Libya dress modestly and most of them wear the Hijab.

The traditional dress is now limited to special occasions; men wear it more often. In fact, it is popularly worn for Friday prayers, Eid (Islamic holiday) and weddings. Although the outfit slightly differs from one area to another, Libyan men’s clothes tend to be similar across entire Libya. It consists of a long white shirt ‘Jalabiya’or ‘Qamis’, long trousers ‘Sirwal’ and a vest called ‘Sadriya’ that is usually heavily knit with black silk and has buttons on its front. Men also wear a headdress called a ‘Shashiyah’ that is usually red or black. Men in Tripolitania prefer wearing the black Shashiyah while the men in Cyrenaica wear both. Libyan men also wear a tight, knitted, white cap underneath the Shashiyah for when they are indoors. A large outer cloak known as ‘Jarid’ is worn on top and wrapped around the body in a Roman-toga way, except in Libya, the Jarid is usually tied at the right shoulder and the remainder is brought around up over the head. Libyan men wear leather boots, usually with a heel for riding horses, leather sandals or slippers.

As for Libyan women, the traditional outfit differs slightly from one region to another; however, the general outfit consists of a blouse with baggy sleeves that are embroidered with beads and silver/gold thread and baggy silk trousers that have an elastic band at the bottom. On top of that, women wear brightly colored cloths are made into dresses like togas and held together by silver brooches. Women in the rural areas use heavy woven rug-like cloths due to the climate. The head is covered using a colorful cloth embellished with colorful pom-poms. Libyan women wear large pieces of gold or silver jewelry. The neckwear usually goes down to the knees and the bracelets are 4–6 inches wide. The large silver brooches used to attach the cloth are now replaced with gold and are usually decorated with a “Khamaisah”, a hand shaped symbol, or other charms that are believed to keep the evil eye off.

Women only wear the full outfit with the jewelry in special occasions and weddings. It is traditional for the groom to give the outfit with the gold to his bride at their wedding and for the bride to wear it the day after. The women’s traditional outfit is very expensive, but the prices vary depending on the quality and weight of gold or silver.

Music

Media
Government control over the media has resulted in much of the population preferring to entertain itself by watching videos or foreign stations via satellite. Libyan television programmes are mostly in Arabic with a 30-minute news broadcast each evening in English and French. It is also possible to watch the occasional sports programs. However, the majority of programming is cultural and thus showcases more traditional Libyan music and entertainment.

Libya's daily newspaper is Al-Fajr al-Jadid and is published in Tripoli. Foreign newspapers are available, but are often very out-of-date by the time they reach the shops.

References